Brenton Alexander Cox Jr. (born January 30, 2000) is an American former college football outside linebacker for the Florida Gators and the Georgia Bulldogs prior to his time at Florida. He was dismissed from the University of Georgia on August 6, 2019, following an arrest and numerous issues with the coaching staff and with personal conduct. He was dismissed from the University of Florida football team on October 31, 2022, after a series of personal conduct issues.

Early life and high school career
Cox grew up in Stockbridge, Georgia and attended Miller Grove High School for two years before transferring to Stockbridge High School. As a senior he recorded 42 tackles with 9.5 tackles for loss and five sacks and was named first team All-State and played in the 2018 Under Armour All-American Game.

College career
Cox began his collegiate career at Georgia. He played in 13 games with 20 tackles and one sack as a true freshman. He made his first career start in the 2019 Sugar Bowl, making six tackles. During the summer going into his sophomore year Cox was dismissed from the team. Shortly afterwards, Cox announced that he would be transferring to the University of Florida.

Cox initially applied for a waiver to play immediately for the Florida Gators, but his appeal was denied and he sat out his sophomore season per NCAA transfer rules. Cox was named a starter going into his redshirt sophomore season. Cox was kicked off the Gators football team on October 31, 2022, after a series of incidents with coaches and strength and conditioning staff. He subsequently declared he would enter the 2023 NFL Draft.

References

External links
Florida Gators bio
Georgia Bulldogs bio

Living people
2000 births
Players of American football from Georgia (U.S. state)
American football linebackers
Florida Gators football players
Georgia Bulldogs football players
African-American players of American football
21st-century African-American sportspeople
20th-century African-American sportspeople